The Government-Household analogy refers to rhetoric in political economic discourse that compares the finances of a federal government to those of a household. The analogy has frequently been made in debates about government debt, with critics of government debt arguing that greater government debt is equivalent to a household taking on more debt.

The analogy has been characterized by economists as misleading and false, as the functions and constraints of governments and households are vastly dissimilar. Differences include that governments can print money, interest rates on government borrowing may be cheaper than individual borrowing, governments can increase their budgets through taxation, governments have indefinite planning horizons, national debt may be held primarily domestically (the equivalent of household members owing each other), governments typically have greater collateral for borrowing, and contractions in government spending can cause or prolong economic crises and increase the debt of the government. For governments, the main risks of overspending may revolve around inflation rather than the size of the debt per se.

According to economist and Nobel laureate William Vickrey,

References 

Political economy